Spring Mill Complex, also known as the Michael Gunkle Spring Mill, is a historic grist mill complex located in East Whiteland Township, Chester County, Pennsylvania. The mill was built in 1793, and is a -story, banked stone structure with a gable roof.  Also on the property are the contributing -story, stuccoed stone miller's house; a 1-story, stone spring house; a 1-story, stone smoke house; and a 1-story, stone carriage house.  The mill remained in continuous operation into the 1940s.

It was added to the National Register of Historic Places in 1978.

References

External links
 Michael Gunkle Spring Mill, Moore Road (East Whiteland Township), Bacton, Chester County, PA: 3 photos, 2 data pages, and 1 photo caption page at Historic American Buildings Survey

Grinding mills on the National Register of Historic Places in Pennsylvania
Industrial buildings completed in 1793
Grinding mills in Chester County, Pennsylvania
National Register of Historic Places in Chester County, Pennsylvania
1793 establishments in Pennsylvania